Żagań  (French and ,) is a town in western Poland, on the Bóbr river, with 25,731 inhabitants (2019). The town is the capital of Żagań County in the historic region of Silesia. Previously in the Zielona Góra Voivodeship (1975–1998), Żagań has been in the Lubusz Voivodeship since 1999.

The town hosts the Polish 11th Armoured Cavalry Division. An American Armored Brigade Combat Team is constantly rotated through the town under Operation Atlantic Resolve.

Etymology
The town's name probably means "place of the burnt forest" (Polish: żegać, żagiew): probably referring to the burning of primeval forest by early settlers. If this is correct, it is consistent with the names of nearby places: Żary, Zgorzelec, Pożarów.

Geography
Żagań is located roughly halfway between Cottbus and Wrocław, approximately 100 meters above sea level and at the centre of the Żagań administrative district. The rural district of Żagań surrounds the town on its northern, eastern and southern sides. Iłowa lies to the south-west and the rural district of Żary is to the north-west. The Rivers Bóbr and Kwisa meet up just outside the town on its south-eastern side.

History

Polish Piast dynasty

The area formed part of Poland after the creation of the state in the 10th century. Żagań was founded in the 12th century by Polish monarch Bolesław IV the Curly near an old settlement of the same name, which name was then changed to Stary Żagań ("Old Żagań"). The name comes from the Old Polish word zagon. It was first mentioned in a 1202 deed, when it belonged to the Duchy of Silesia under the rule of the Piast duke Henry I the Bearded, within fragmented Poland. In 1251, it became part of the newly created Duchy of Głogów under Henry's grandson Konrad I. Duke Konrad I granted Żagań town rights between 1248 and 1260. The town developed wealth from development of mining, and attracted German settlers from the west.

After Konrad's death in 1274, his heirs again divided the duchy and the castle of Żagań became the residence of his youngest son Przemko of Ścinawa, Duke of Żagań from 1278, who established a monastery of the Augustinian Canons here. Thus the Duchy of Żagań came into the existence. In 1284, he swapped his estates for the Duchy of Ścinawa and was succeeded by his elder brother Konrad II the Hunchback. When Konrad II died in 1304, all the former Głogów estates were reunified under his surviving brother Henry III.

In 1309, Henry III of Głogów was succeeded by his eldest son Henry IV the Faithful, who in 1321 again had to divide the duchy with his younger brothers. He ceded Głogów to Przemko II and retired to Żagań, which again became the capital of a duchy in its own right. In 1329, all the sons of Henry III of Głogów became vassals of John of Luxembourg, the King of Bohemia - with the exception of Przemko II who died suddenly two years later. When in 1393 Henry VI the Older, grandson of Henry IV, died without issue, the estates were again reunified with Głogów until in 1412 Jan I, the eldest son of Duke Henry VIII the Sparrow, became the sole ruler of the Żagań duchy.

Saxon, Habsburg and Prussian rule
After a fierce battle for the inheritance, Jan II the Mad, son of Jan I, finally sold it to Duke Albert III of Saxony from the House of Wettin, thus ending the centuries-long Piast rule.

In 1549, Elector Maurice of Saxony ceded Sagan to the Bohemian king Ferdinand I of Habsburg. Emperor Ferdinand II of Habsburg allotted the fief to Albrecht von Wallenstein, his supreme commander in the Thirty Years' War in 1627. It then passed to the illustrious Bohemian family of Lobkowicz, who had the Baroque Żagań Palace erected. One of two main routes connecting Warsaw and Dresden ran through the town in the 18th century and Kings Augustus II the Strong and Augustus III of Poland traveled that route numerous times. After the First Silesian War of 1742, Żagań became part of Prussia. It was part of the Province of Silesia of Prussia and after 1871 Germany. In the 19th century Żagań was still a significant Polish center.

In 1786, the fief was purchased by Peter von Biron, Duke of Courland, and in 1843, it passed to his daughter Dorothea, the wife of Edmond de Talleyrand, a nephew of the great French diplomat Talleyrand, who spent her retirement years at Sagan. A patent of King Frederick William IV of Prussia on 6 January 1845 invested her as Duchess of Sagan; and Napoleon III recognized the title in France, in favour of her son Louis.

Second World War
The double title (a prince and a duc) both Prussian and French, served to render the duc de Sagan a neutral party during the Second World War: his Château de Valençay provided a safe haven for treasures of the Louvre during the German occupation of France.

During the war, the Germans operated two prisoner-of-war camps and a forced labour camp in the town, all intended for prisoners of various nationalities. Sagan was occupied by Soviet troops during the third week of February 1945, following several days of savage fighting.

Prisoner of war camps and The Great Escape
As early as 1939, soon after invading Poland, Nazi Germany established a system of prisoner of war (POW) camps in Sagan. In total, the Mannschafts-Stammlager Stalag VIIIC and its subsidiaries held over 300,000 prisoners from some 30 different countries. It is estimated that around 120,000 of them died of hunger, disease and maltreatment. Later, in 1942, an additional camp was set up for Allied pilots, called Stalag Luft III.  

In March 1942, the town became the location of the Stalag Luft III camp for captured airmen (Kriegsgefangenen Stammlager der Luftwaffe 3 Sagan). It was the site of the most courageous escape resulting in the killing of 50 prisoners including the following Polish flight officers: Major Antoni Kiewnarski; Lieutenant Stanisław Król; and navigation Lieutenants Włodzimierz Kolanowski, Jerzy Mondschein, Kazimierz Pawluk and Paweł Tobolski. This episode of history was the subject of the 1963 film The Great Escape, starring Steve McQueen. It was the biggest and the most deadly escape of officer aircrew captured by Nazi Germany during the entire war. The number of prisoners attempting the escape was 200, of whom 76 managed to leave the camp; 73 were caught and 50 executed on Hitler's orders. Just three successfully escaped, one to Gibraltar and two to Sweden. All three reunited in England.

There were only a few other, similar escapes from German POW camps during the Second World War. A slightly smaller one on March 6, 1943, from Oflag XXI-B in Szubin, involved 43 British officers. On September 19–20, 1943, an escape from the Oflag VI B in Dössel near Wartburg involved 47 Polish officers. A day later 67 French officers escaped from Edelbach in Austria 67. Another involved 54 French soldiers on December 18, 1943, from Marlag near Hamburg.

Modern Poland

After Nazi Germany's defeat, the town became again part of Poland as the result of the border changes decided at the Potsdam Conference. The totality of the town's population was expelled, and the town was repopulated by Poles, many displaced from former eastern Poland annexed by the Soviet Union.

Clearing the rubble began in 1947, and was followed by the establishment of small enterprises, factories and schools. During the 1970s, a "new town" quarter was built, and by 1983, the historic baronial château ("Żagań Palace") had been fully rebuilt.

For many years regiments of the Soviet Air Forces flew from the town's airbase (Żagań-Tomaszowo?). In 1992 the 42nd Guards Bomber Aviation Regiment finally left and was disbanded after a brief stay at Szprotawa.

In the years 1967–1971 a museum dedicated to the history of prisoners of war of the Stalag VIII-C camp was established. In 2011, the former Augustinian monastery complex with the church of the Assumption was designated a Historic Monument of Poland. In 2013, the first Polish monument of Wojtek the Bear, soldier of the Polish II Corps during World War II, was unveiled in Żagań.

Sights and monuments

 Baroque ducal palace
 Palace park
 Post-Augustinian Monastery Complex with the church of the Assumption, named one of Poland's official national Historic Monuments (Pomnik historii), as designated on March 11, 2011. Its listing is maintained by the National Heritage Board of Poland. 
 Post-franciscan monastery with the Saints Peter and Paul church
 Town hall
 Museum of the World War II POW camp
 Monument of Wojtek the Bear, soldier of the II Corps of the Polish Army during World War II
 Post-evangelical Church Tower
 Medieval town walls

Sports
Żagań is home to sports' clubs
 Czarni Żagań – football club, now plays in the lower leagues, 1964–65 Polish Cup runner-up
 WKS Sobieski Żagań – volleyball club, now plays in II liga (3rd tier)
 KS Bóbr Żagań – volleyball and rugby club
 UKS Orzeł Żagań – youth unihockey club

Transport

Roads running through Żagań
 Voivodeship road 296

 Voivodeship road 295

 National road 12

Important roads running near Żagań

 National road 27

 National road 18

  Motorway A18 / E 36

  Motorway A4 / E 40

  Expressway S3 / E 65

Notable people 

Johannes Kepler (1571–1630), German astronomer, mathematician and astrologer, lived in Sagan in 1628–1630
Albrecht von Wallenstein (1583–1634), duke of Sagan from 1627 to 1634
Johann Ignaz von Felbiger (1724–1788), educational reformer, abbot of the Order of. St. Augustine in Sagan
Peter von Biron (1724–1800), duke of Sagan from 1786 to 1800
Louis XVIII (1755–1824), future king of France. He spent several months in 1793 in Sagan.
Stendhal (1783–1842), French writer, spent several months in 1813 in Sagan
Dorothea de Talleyrand-Périgord (1793–1862), princess of Sagan from 1844 to 1862
Adolf Engler (1844–1930), German botanist
Reinhold Röhricht (1842–1905), German historian, studied at the Gymnasium in Sagan in 1852–1862
Wolfgang Paalen (1905–1959), Austrian painter and art philosopher, member of the Surrealist Group, spent part of his childhood in his father's castle St. Rochusburg near Sagan from 1913 to 1928
Bronisława Wajs (1908–1987), Polish-Romani classic poet. She lived in Żagań in the '50s.
Hans-Jürgen Steinmann (1929–2008), novelist
Wolfgang Samuel (born 1935), German child refugee, author, U.S. Air Force pilot
Ilse Kokula (born 1944), educator, author, LGBT activist
Mariusz Jurasik (born 1976), handball player
Łukasz Garguła (born 1981), footballer
Konrad Michalak (born 1997), footballer.

Twin towns – sister cities

Żagań is twinned with:

 Duns, Scotland, United Kingdom
 Netphen, Germany
 Ortrand, Germany
 Saint-Omer, France
 Teltow, Germany
 Grumo Nevano, Italy

Notable facts

Johannes Kepler started writing the early science fiction Somnium (novel) before his death in 1630.
In 1769, one of the first lightning rods in Europe was installed on the Church of the Assumption in the local Augustinian monastery.

References

External links

Official town webpage
Palace in Żagań
Jewish Community in Żagań on Virtual Shtetl
Heimatkreisgemeinschaft Sagan Sprottau e.V. Organization of refugees

Cities and towns in Lubusz Voivodeship
Żagań County
12th-century establishments in Poland
Populated places established in the 12th century